Sprint Cars are powered by a naturally-aspirated, methanol-injected overhead valve V-8 engines; with a displacement of 410 cubic inches (6.7L) and capable of engine speeds approaching 9000 rpm.

Applications
Sprint cars

References

External links

 
 
 
 

Sprint car racing
V8 engines